Hans-Jürgen Ripp (24 June 1946 – 4 July 2021) was a German professional footballer who played as a defender. He spent nine seasons in the Bundesliga with Hamburger SV. In August 2017, he was the player with the fourth most number of Bundesliga appearances without scoring a goal.

Personal life
Ripp was born in Niendorf, Hamburg. His father, Johannes, introduced him to the youth football of Hamburger SV. During his time with the youth teams, he acquired the nickname Ditschi. When he was 18 years old, he married Bärbel.

Following his football career, he worked in the insurance industry. He had two daughters.

Honours
 UEFA Cup Winners' Cup: 1976–77
 Bundesliga: 1978–79; runner-up 1975–76
 DFB-Pokal: 1975–76; runner-up 1973–74

References

External links
 

1946 births
2021 deaths
Footballers from Hamburg
German footballers
Association football defenders
Bundesliga players
Hamburger SV players
Lüneburger SK players
West German footballers